John Monaghan may refer to:
 John R. Monaghan, United States Navy officer
 John James Joseph Monaghan, American prelate of the Roman Catholic Church
 Rinty Monaghan (John Joseph Monaghan), flyweight boxer from Belfast
 Jack Monaghan (1921–2022), New Zealand amateur wrestler
 John Monaghan (businessman), New Zealand dairy executive with Fonterra

See also
 John Monahan (disambiguation)